Brainard Cemetery is a historic  cemetery in Portland, Oregon's Montavilla neighborhood, in the United States. Operated by Metro, the cemetery was acquired by Multnomah County in 1953.

In 2015, the Portland Mercury included Brainard Cemetery in a list of "Portland's Most Overrated Cemeteries", saying: "Don't waste your time. Brainard's the equivalent of the darkened street where you know people are home, but no one's giving out treats. Most of the ghosts here are chill as hell, preferring to spend Halloween in their cozy "ghost nests" (small beds of twigs and sticks where ghosts relax) over torturing the living. There's one casually racist specter named Emmett who's usually around, but he's a bummer more than anything else. PASS!"

References

External links

 
 

Cemeteries in Portland, Oregon
Metro (Oregon regional government)
Montavilla, Portland, Oregon